Jeniang is a small town in Kuala Muda District, Kedah state, Malaysia.

There are several convenient locations for accommodation and leisure purposes.

 Chemara Dusuntara Homestay
 Kvaloya Jeniang Homestay
 D'Mama Chalet with Swimming Pool
 Homestay Pak Tam

Kuala Muda District
Towns in Kedah